Pujiang is a county of Zhejiang, China. It is under the administration of Jinhua city.

Pujiang County is located in the center of Zhejiang Province, in the north of Jinhua's jurisdiction, bounded by Yiwu and Lanxi to the south, Jiande to the west and Zhuji to the east. It is rich in the ecological tourism resources with the AAAA level tourist area of Xinhua Mountain and the recent developed scenic spots as Bashiwan, Baozhang Valley, Shenli Gorge, Tongji Lake and The First Family of Southern China. The latter, the Zheng Family Clan descendants have been living in Pujiang for fifteen generations. It also has “Shangshan Cultural Relics,” which has been the earliest site of New Stone Age discovered so far in the bright pearl history of Zhejiang culture.

Pujiang is famous for the Puyang River and it was called Feng in ancient times. It was set up as a county in the second year of Donghan Xingping (195 AD).  The name was changed to Pujiang County in the third year of Wuyue Tianhao (910 AD), which has been used until now.  There is no lack of talented people here.  Among them, the most famous are Songlian as the founding minister of the Ming Dynasty and Donggaoxinyue who went to Japan and was known as the father of seal cutting there.  Pujiang is also named as “County of Chinese Painting and Calligraphy” and “County of Chinese Folk Art.”  The industry in Pujiang is varied, among which crystals and padlocks take up to 70% market sale, which makes Pujiang as the collecting and distributing center of crystal and padlocks in China.  Thus it is named the “Crystal Capital” and “Padlock Center.”

Administrative divisions
Subdistricts:
Punan Subdistrict (浦南街道), Xianhua Subdistrict (仙华街道), Puyang Subdistrict (浦阳街道)

Towns:
Huangzhai (黄宅镇), Yantou (岩头镇), Zhengzhai (郑宅镇), Tanxi (檀溪镇), Hangping (杭坪镇), Baima (白马镇), Zhengjiawu (郑家坞镇)

Townships:
Yuzhai Township (虞宅乡), Dafan Township (大畈乡), Zhongyu Township (中余乡), Qianwu Township (前吴乡), Huaqiao Township (花桥乡)

Climate

Tourism

The First Family of Southern China

The First Family in the South of the Yangtze River is a historic and cultural site situated in the village of Zhengzhai in Pujiang.  it was built in the Yuan dynasty, covering an area of 6,600 square meters.

The Zheng family clan legacy began during the Southern Song dynasty (1127) and carried through the Ming dynasty (1487); over 360 years.  During that time the family had 173 career officials and the family was recognized by the Ming dynasty emperor as jiangnan di yi jia, the first family of Southern China.” On both sides of the Zheng Ancestral Hall are ten characters: loyalty, faith, family, fraternity, propriety, justice, honesty, shame, farming and reading. From these words we can see that the family advocates loyalty to the country, being a person of integrity, having filial piety, humility towards neighbors and to have a clean and simple principled life.

Over generations the family accumulated and refined a set of 168 house rules or norms offering guidance on ethnics and interpersonal relationships, as well as rules on managing a communal clan. The rules are essentially detailed instructions on various clan affairs and can be grouped into five categories: memorial ceremonies, organizational structure of the clan, weddings and funerals, the clan and local people, and personal conduct. Clan members are obliged to show obedience and piety to parents, to show brotherly love to siblings, and to show respect for spouse, describing this as the basis on which prosperity of the clan is built. The aforementioned instructions for men and women are like a kind of code of conduct.

According to the Zheng family an in-corrupt government culture means using morality to cultivate the character, etiquette to develop one's personality, rules to balance the family relationship and using the self-sacrificing spirit to help the rest of the world; the main thoughts of Confucius.

The family rules state that the offspring who desire to be an official are supposed to be given considerable financial assistance and encouragement. To those who have become a government official, they should abide by the laws and make every effort to deal with those laws earnestly.

Rule 88, specifically addresses corruption.  If a family member abuses their position they will bring about shame onto themselves.  The rules specifically state that their names will be crossed out of the family tree, their remains will not be kept in the family mausoleum and they will not have a chance to return to the family even after their death.

Other rules speak to social responsibility.  Rule 97 states that if neighbors or relatives are short of food, Zheng descendants would better lend them some food and get the food back after the harvest season without asking for interest. Then in Rule 99, it states that if a Zheng descendant has extra money, they are expected to donate some to repair a collapsed bridge or a muddy road. In a simpler sense, help the community and infrastructure.  In Rule 100, if a neighbor becomes seriously ill, Zheng descendants should care for them.

During the Ming and Qing Dynasties, the state emphasized village society control, encouraging families throughout the kingdom to set norms upon family members and vested family elders with the power to enforce these norms. It was in this period that the family rules achieved  rapid  development,  having increasingly  mature  content and form  and  general  support  from  authorities;  therefore,   the Ming  and  Qing  Dynasties  became  a typical  time  for  the development of ancient family rules.

Family is the most basic unit of traditional Chinese society. Individuals are inseparable from their families. People in ancient times wrote about their successful ways of managing a large family, i.e., the so-called family disciplines, to be followed by future generations. The writings pass down not only experience in managing a large family, but also Confucian values followed by many Chinese people, and exercise profound impact on individuals.

Xianhua Mountain

Xianhua Mountain is situated in the north of Pujiang.  it is a national AAAA scenic destination.  Liu Bowen a poet during the Ming Dynatsy wrote thaty "the greatness of Xianua Mountain lies in its unique feature, it looks like a cloud floating in heaven."  The highest mountain, 720.8 meters high, has always been considered as the "first fairy mountain." "Seven fairy maidens" depicted as sent down to earth.

Shenli Gorge

In the south of Shenli Gorge, the mountains are high and steep, with thick forest and marvelous water around. Birds, animals, and grassland are everywhere with exotic rocks and magnificent falls around.

In the northern part are ancestral halls and buildings of Ming and Qing Dynasty. There are several scenic spots here like the Censer Hidden in the Smog, Zhuyan Falls, Stalagmite and Cool Spring, the Sleeping Celestial, Zhutou Mountain, Grandpa Chen Carrying Stones, Valley of One-Hundred Steps, Meteor Cliff for Watching Eagles, etc.

In this gorge, a three kilometer ancient post house named “Tenli Paviliion.” Since ancient times, ten beautiful legends have evolved and are still popular today. These include Huizhounese Gining Treasure, Grandpa Chen Carrying Stones, Shanniang Sleeps Eternally, Geshan Temple, and Zhutou Mountain Light.

Shenli Gorge has always been a good place for writers to visit since the Song Dynasty. Many famous writers of Song, Yuan, Ming, and Qing Dynasty have written travel journals and poems about the gorge.

Baishiwan

Baishiwan scenic spot was developed in 2000 with an area of 18 square kilometers. It consist of two valleys about over 30 kilometers either in the east and west side. In this scenic spot, the hills roll continuously with green forest and fresh air.  Rocks with peculiar shapes stand all around. The caves in the scenic spot are mysterious. Along the valleys, the eater of the ponds and falls flow and fall all year round like  paradise on earth. Many areas have been established here like the reception are for relaxation, camping, area with barbecue. It has become an ecological scenic spot with hills and waters, which is combined with sight-seeing, relaxation and recreation.

Ma Ling

Ma Ling scenic spot is located in the center of Zhouzhai in Huyuan River Bsin, northwest of Pujiang, where three counties, Pujiang, Jiande and Tonglu meet in the towering mountains and high ridges. It covers an area of 10 square kilometers, including 38 scenic spots. The peculiar mountains and queer rocks content with each other to show their charm. The ancient trees tower to the sky; the vines creep up the hills and stones; trees and grass grow luxuriantly.

In the east of Ma Ling stretches over a ridge from east to west, which is 25 kilometers long like a curtain hanging from the sky.  On the top of the ridge is a slope extending widely, which is called Red Rock Summit. On the west of the top is a valley of several thousand deep. To the west of the valley is a mountain with a very steep cliff. On the mountain, there is a limestone cave like a window, which is pervious to light from the south to north and it is called a coral. Atop the mountain is an ancient cypress.  On the top of Ma Ling towers up to the heaven a mountain about 720 meters high. This mountain leans from the west to the north, like the neck of a horse. The top of the mountain stretches from east to south like a face of a horse, on which there are cliffs and rocks. Much thick grass and bushes grow there, fuzzy like the hair of the horse. So it is called Matou Mountain. Ma Ling gets its name because of this.

The Beauty Mountain looks like a mushroom cloud rising up slowly to the sky.  Viewing it from a distance and it is like a portrait of a maiden facing to the south standing on a cloud.  It can be called an exotic rock in the middle of Zhejiang Proving.  Longmoshi Ridge stretches ahead about one kilometer, wriggling like a snake and shaped like a dragon.

Tongji Lake

Tongji Lake was built in 1956 with its dam 35 meters high and 275 meters long.  Nine hundred and sixty-two cubic meters of earth and stone were used in this construction and 3.68 million workers worked on it.  Sixteen villages were flooded and 1152 families including 4566 villagers moved away from here.  Thanks to this lake, both sides of the Puyang River became granaries despite drought or excessive rain.  This lake starts from the dam in the east to Maqiaotou in the west, stretching from Siquan Mountain and Wanwu Mountain in the south to the southern slope of Ming Mountain (now Qianwu village) in the north.  Normally this lake can hold 58.8 cubic meters of water.  There are six islands and dozens of peninsulas n the lake.  With its scenery and thick forests, the lake area is an ideal place for the tourists to enjoy the sightseeing, water activities, fishing, etc.

Baozhang Valley

Baozhang Valley lies in the north of Pujing, 10 kilometers away from the county town, covering an area of 10.5 square kilometers.  It consists of springs, rocks, caves and temples.  On either side of the valley are two weaving crags rising high into the cloud.  At the bottom of the alley, gently flows the murmuring brook.  The spring water here is cool and sweet.  In the valley, the cloud steams and becomes radiant and the hills are always shrouded in the mist rising slowly in the valley.  All these make the valley shrouded in mystery.

The Baozhang Temple was built in the valley.  In the Fifteenth Year of Zhenguan during the Tang Dynasty, the senior monk Baozhang Zen master from Middle India came to live here after he roamed half of China.  He said “after roaming most of China, only this place is worth traveling.”

Songxi Village

Songxi is a historical village in the eastern part of Pujiang county. The population of the village is around 3000 and majority of the people are in their later years. Most of the young people from the village have moved to nearby cities in search of work. Jinhua Municipal Corporation has started a program called Home+ where visitors can come to village and stay with the host family to experience the life in rural China.

Songxi got its name from the Songxi stream which flows through the heart of the village. People have not only built bridges on the stream but also built houses on the stream. It is a belief that this keeps the house safe from all evils. The stone paved roads, water gushing in the hidden stream, ancestral architecture like Xu's and Shao's Ancestral hall are major attraction in Songxi. Songxi has had many famous calligraphers and poets. Some of them even live in the village.

Folklore

The Legend of Baozhang Valley

There is a temple situated on Baozhang Mountain, east of Pujiang Xinhua Mountain, known as the Baozhang Temple.

Behind the temple is a mountain hill that resembles an “Emperor’s Umbrella” (in Chinese called “Huangluo Gaisan”, which translates to yellow dragon umbrella cover - an ancient umbrella cover used as the emperor's shelter on his travels).

There is a famous legend associated with the above mountain.

Once upon a time, there was a small village located at the foot of Baozhang Mountain. The inhabitants of the village was a closely knit community. Amongst them lived a married couple, with two black dogs. The husband was a farmer.

The couple unfortunately had no luck in bearing a child for years. One night the farmer's wife dreamt of a dragon flying to their house and landing on their roof. Having inspected no trail of a dragon on their roof and realising it was only a dream, the couple paid no serious attention to this dream.

A couple of days later, their dogs started taking turns climbing up the roof and stood by, no matter rain or shine. Soon after, the farmer's wife found out that she was pregnant.

The couple was puzzled why their dogs were climbing up their roof everyday and were frustrated since the dogs refused to listen and stay off the roof no matter what the couple did.

The farmer, frustrated by the dogs, killed one of the dogs on the ground as a lesson to the other dog on the roof. Despite this, the dog on the roof remained persistent and stayed on the roof for couple of weeks before succumbing to death from hunger and fell off the roof.

On the same day, a fortune teller passing through the village and by the farmer's house, paid the couple a visit and spoke to them, “Your house is filled with the omen of luck, although suppressed by an evil force....…”.  After talking to the couple and learning of what had happened during the last few weeks, the fortune teller explained to the farmer, “Your wife is pregnant with an emperor son - the son of heaven - and the two black dogs were here to protect your family. They climbed up to the roof to protect your wife's pregnancy and your child's identity. Now that the dogs are dead, the incumbent emperor has become aware of your wife's pregnancy and to secure his throne, he will despatch his soldiers to kill the two of you.”

The farmer, panicked and desperate, begged for a solution to escape. Unknown to the couple, the fortune teller is actually a deity and come to their rescue. He gave the farmer a handful of sand and a chopstick, and explained carefully, “When you are running away from the soldiers, throw a handful of sand behind you and the chopstick in front of you. The sand will turn into a mountain and the chopstick will open up a road path for you. The soldiers will not be able to pursue you further.” He then disappeared into the thin air.

On that night itself, as predicted by the deity, soldiers invaded the village and the couple knew it must be the soldiers searching for them, and thus they escaped from the house. The soldiers saw them and gave chase to them. Just when the soldiers were gaining on them, the farmer, reminded of the deity's words, threw the chopstick behind him and a handful of sand in front of him. Immediately, a mountain blocked the couple's way ahead whilst a wide road path extended behind him. They were hunted down by the soldiers without much effort, and they and the unborn child killed at the site.

Subsequently, the mountain hill behind the Baozhang Temple took the shape of the Emperor's Umbrella (Huangluo Gaisan) and it is said that it was probably formed as a memorial for the unborn son of the heaven......

Famous People

Hong Xuntao

Hong Xuntao (1928.4.9 - 2001.9.22) was a famous children's literature author and theorist.  His most notable work is his adaption of the folklore story "The Magic Paint Brush - The Story of Ma Liang." He dedicated his life to writing and studying children's literature and has been recognized for his contributions and was a member of the Chinese Writers Association, China Film Association, China Folk Literature and Art Association, Director of the Shanghai Writers Association, was Executive Director of the Chinese research society for children's literature.

Song Lian

Song Lian (1310—1381), also known as Jing Lian, Qian Xi. He was a litterateur in the late Yuan and early Ming dynasties. He was praised as "The first official minister of Ming" by Zhu Yuanzhang, emperor of the Ming dynasty. He was one of the three masters of poetry in the early Ming dynasty, and the other two were Gao Qi and Liu Ji. His representative works were A Farewell to Ma Junze of Dongyang and so on.

Zhang Rui

Zhang Rui (1909.3-2014.9.17) was a former vice-minister of the military affairs department of the general staff headquarters of China. In 1933, he joined the Chinese workers' and peasants' red army. In 1936, he joined the Communist Party of China. He took part in the battle of Zhiluo town, Pingcheng guan, Lufang, Yimeng mountain area against "iron wall encirclement", Liaoshen, Pingjin and the Long March. Zhang Rui was a member of the fourth and fifth national committees of the Chinese people's political consultative conference. In 1955, he was awarded the rank of major general.

Madame Wu

Madame Wu (Song Dynasty, 13th century) was the author of the Wushi Zhongkuilu, an important Medieval Chinese work on household cookery. The cookbook provide a glimpse of common foods and ingredients prepared for day-to-day consumption in Chinese households during the late Song Dynasty. Wu is the earliest known woman author of Chinese cuisine.

Specialty

Pujiang Tofu Skin

Tofu skin is a natural oil film formed on the surface of soybean milk after boiling. It can be found on tables in the north and south of China, and it can be made into many different dishes. Tofu skin is not only delicious but also has a lot of nutritional value. Tofu skin has high protein, lecithin and minerals. It can prevent cardiovascular disease and protect the heart. Moreover, tofu skin is beneficial for bone development and the prevention of osteoporosis.

Pujiang tofu skin is a traditional specialty of Pujiang. It has more than 1200 years’ history. The raw material of Pujiang tofu skin is Pujiang Chun soybean. Production process: soaking, grinding, filtering, burning pulp, conjunctiva, dredging, drying. The final products of Pujiang tofu skin is yellow in white and mellow. The local people use a dish of tofu skin and eggs to serve guests, which is a high etiquette. Every year, about 2,400 tons of Pujiang tofu skins are produced and export to Japan and Southeast Asia, the main places of production are Wuda Road, SharenTou, Zhong Village and Wei Village. The annual value of Pujiang tofu skin is 36 million yuan. In 2012, pujiang tofu skin production technology became the provincial intangible cultural heritage.

Peach-shaped plum

Peach-shaped plum appeared in Pujiang county in the 1980s. Peach-shaped plum is a new product grafted from peach and plum trees. Peach - shaped plum is one of the famous, special and new treasured fruit trees in Pujiang county Jinhua city, Zhejiang province, and it won the gold medal in the national agricultural fair. It looks like peach, but the color and skin are same as plum. It tastes of both peach and plum, sour and sweet. Peach-shaped plum is rich in nutrition. The study of department of food processing in Zhejiang University and institute of horticulture, Zhejiang academy of agricultural sciences shows that peach-shaped plum has a variety of essential amino acids for human body, and potassium, sodium, calcium, magnesium, iron and other trace elements, minerals and vitamin B1, vitamin B2, carotenoids. It also has many benefits such as clear heat, diuretic, help digestion, spleen.

In recent years, the government has promulgated some policies to help farmers and promote the development of peach-shaped plum. The planting area of peach shaped plum expanded from 49 mu to more than 50,000 mu. Every year, there are about 50,000 tons of peaches and plums produced, and the output value is 260 million yuan.

Climbing Fig Tofu

Climbing fig tofu is a dessert made from climbing fig, which looks like a clear or yellowish jelly. It has no taste in itself, so the locals use white or brown sugar for flavoring. Climbing fig tofu is only sold in summer, and it is very cheap, usually no more than 5 yuan. It is popular in Pujiang, and people even can find it anywhere. Climbing fig tofu has the function of removing moisture, promoting blood circulation, detumescence, detoxification and tonifying kidney.

Customs and Culture

Pujiang Paper-cuts
 
Pujiang paper-cuts have a long history, which appeared in the Yuan dynasty and the Ming dynasty. Song Lian which was a poet in Pujiang mentioned the paper-cuts in his poem. In the Qing dynasty, the local opera was developing quickly in Pujiang. By the influence of local opera, the paper-cut for opera characters appeared. After a long time, it formed the present Pujiang Paper-cuts. However, Pujiang paper-cuts are dying out because the number of heirs is small, and fewer and fewer people know the Pujiang paper-cuts.

In 2008, Pujiang paper-cuts becomes the China's intangible cultural heritage. In 1993, Pujiang was named "hometown of Chinese folk art (paper-cut)" by the Chinese ministry of culture.

Pujiang Opera

Pujiang opera is an ancient opera and originated in the Song dynasty in Pujiang. It is popular in Pujiang, Linan, Jiande, and Tonglu, and spread to Zhejiang, Jiangxi and Fujian. Pujiang opera is based on the local "vegetable basket song" and developed under the influence of south opera. South opera is one of the oldest opera in China. Pujiang opera was popular in local people, but it didn't appear on the stage until the middle of the Ming dynasty. In 2006, Pujiang opera has been listed as an intangible cultural heritage of China.

References

External links
 TRAVELZHEJIANG - The Official Travel Guide of Zhejiang Province

 
County-level divisions of Zhejiang
Geography of Jinhua